The 2007–08 season of the División de Honor B de Balonmano is the 14th season of second-tier handball in Spain.

Final standings

External links
Scores
Standings

División de Plata de Balonmano seasons
2007–08 in Spanish handball